Muangthalang School is a public secondary school in Thalang District, Phuket, Thailand. The school belongs to the Secondary Educational Service Area Office 14, Office of the Basic Education Commission (OBEC), Ministry of Education. The school was founded at Thalang, Phuket, Thailand in 1971 as a district school.

Symbols 
 Name : Muangthalang School, MT(abbr.), Muang(colloquially)
 Motto  : No light is as bright as wisdom.
 Seal : Thao Thep Kasattri and Thao Sri Sunthon  : Two Heroines of Thalang.
 Colors : Orange and blue

Curriculum 
The school follows the National Curriculum of Basic Education, BE 2544 (2001 CE), providing six years of secondary education, Mathayom 1–6.

Programs 
 Science - Math Ability Program (For Grades 7–9: Mathayom 1–3)
 Science - Math Ability Program (For Grades 10–12: Mathayom 4–6)
 Science - Math
 Arts - Math
 Arts - French
 Arts - Chinese
 Arts - Japanese
 Thai - Sociology

References 
 www.mt.ac.th Website of Muangthalang School (Thai only)
Schools in Thailand
Buildings and structures in Phuket province